Eliott Sorin (born 1 March 1993) is a French footballer who plays as a midfielder for AS Vitré.

External links

 

1993 births
Living people
Association football midfielders
French footballers
Footballers from Rennes
Ligue 2 players
Dijon FCO players
AS Vitré players